Welch College, formerly the Free Will Baptist Bible College, is a private Free Will Baptist college in Gallatin, Tennessee. Founded in 1942, it is one of several higher learning institutions associated with the National Association of Free Will Baptists. Welch College serves 431 students as of 2019 from nearly two dozen states and several foreign countries  and offers 40 majors with its top programs including theological studies, premed/nursing, business, teacher education and music.

History
The National Association of Free Will Baptists in general session in Nashville, Tennessee, called for the creation of Free Will Baptist Bible College and its doors opened in 1942 as a two-year institution. Dr. Linton C. Johnson was its first President. Eight students composed the original student body. The college added a third year of study in 1949, a fourth year in 1950 and awarded its first Bachelor's degrees to five students in 1951.

In August 2008 the college purchased a  tract in Gallatin, Tennessee, to become the site of a larger campus.

In July 2012 at the National Association of Free Will Baptists in Memphis, the denomination voted to change the name of the college to Welch College.  It was renamed for John L. Welch and his wife Mary; Mr. Welch was a prominent figure in the merger of Free Will Baptist bodies into the NAFWB denomination.

Controversies 
In August 2019, the college briefly attracted national attention when administrators suspended a transgender student, attributing the action to a conflict in student policy. The student had undergone a double mastectomy as part of his transition process days prior to the suspension.

Academics

The college offers Bachelor of Arts, Bachelor of Science, and Bachelor of Music Education degree programs. Two- and three-year associate degree programs are also offered as well as a Master of Arts in Theology.

Athletics
The athletic teams of Welch College are called the "Flames" and compete in the National Christian College Athletic Association (NCCAA). Currently there are five varsity teams.

Men's sports
Basketball
Golf
Cross Country
Soccer (Fall 2018)

Women's sports
Basketball
Volleyball
Golf
Cross Country
Soccer (Fall 2018)

References

External links

Official website

Association for Biblical Higher Education
Association of Christian College Athletics member schools
Bible colleges
Educational institutions established in 1942
Free Will Baptist schools
Universities and colleges accredited by the Southern Association of Colleges and Schools
Universities and colleges in Nashville, Tennessee
Private universities and colleges in Tennessee
1942 establishments in Tennessee